Ronald Norman may refer to:

 Ronald Collet Norman, banker, administrator and politician. Chairman of the BBC Board of Governors from 1935 to 1939 and of London County Council from 1918 to 1919
 Sir Ronald Norman (businessman) OBE DL, businessman, honoured with a knighthood in 1995 for services to Teesside, and author of Odd Man Out in the Alps